Charles E. Forsyth (November 23, 1849 – January 31, 1933) was an American politician in the state of Washington. He served in the Washington State Senate from 1889 to 1893.

References

1849 births
1933 deaths
Republican Party Washington (state) state senators